Ray Pawson is Professor of Social Research Methodology in the School of Sociology and Social Policy at the University of Leeds.

Pawson's main interest lies in research methodology.  He has written widely on the philosophy and practice of research, covering methods qualitative and quantitative, pure and applied, contemporaneous and historical. He is the author of 'Realist Synthesis', a new approach of literature review that, in the last years, has widely influenced systematic review practices of complex programmes and policies all over the world.

Select bibliography
Pawson, R. (2006) Evidence Based Policy: A Realist Perspective, Sage.
Pawson, R.; Tilley, N (1997) Realistic Evaluation, Sage.
Pawson, R. (1989) A Measure for Measures: A Manifesto for Empirical Sociology, Routledge.
Pawson, R. (1996) "Theorizing the Interview," British Journal of Sociology 47, pp. 296–314.
Pawson, R. (2006) "Simple Principles for The Evaluation of Complex Programmes," In: Killoran, A et al. Evidence Based Public Health, Oxford University Press.

References

Academics of the University of Leeds
British sociologists
Living people
Year of birth missing (living people)